Juan Cruz González (born 2 December 1996) is an Argentine professional footballer who plays as a right-back for Chacarita Juniors.

Career
González began his Chacarita Juniors career in 2016, he was an unused substitute for a Primera B Nacional game against Juventud Unida on 27 February. On 8 March, González made his professional debut for the club in an away league victory to Villa Dálmine. Fifteen further appearances came during 2016, prior to twenty-one in 2016–17 which included his first career goal on 16 September 2016 versus Crucero del Norte; Chacarita won promotion to the Argentine Primera División in 2016–17. His debut in the top-flight arrived on 17 September 2017 against Atlético Tucumán.

Personal life
In September 2020, it was confirmed that González had tested positive for COVID-19 amid the pandemic; he was asymptomatic.

Career statistics
.

References

External links

1996 births
Living people
Footballers from Córdoba, Argentina
Argentine footballers
Association football defenders
Primera Nacional players
Argentine Primera División players
Chacarita Juniors footballers
Central Córdoba de Santiago del Estero footballers